Ivor Gerald Stirling (19 February 1916 – 21 September 1979) was a New Zealand rugby league footballer who represented New Zealand.

Playing career
Stirling represented Auckland and was named in the New Zealand national rugby league team.

Stirling was part of the 1939 New Zealand tour that was cancelled due to World War II.

During the War, Stirling joined the New Zealand Army and played rugby union during the 1940 season.

After World War Two, Stirling represented the North Shore Albions in the Auckland Rugby League competition.

Personal life
Stirling's son, Ken, also represented New Zealand in rugby league while his daughter, Glenda, represented New Zealand in swimming at the 1968 Summer Olympics.

References

1916 births
1979 deaths
New Zealand rugby league players
New Zealand national rugby league team players
Auckland rugby league team players
North Shore Albions players
New Zealand Army personnel
New Zealand military personnel of World War II
New Zealand rugby union players